Balambala is a constituency in Kenya. It is one of six constituencies in Garissa County.
Its representative in the National Assembly is Hon Abdi Omar Shurie of Jubilee Party.

References 

Constituencies in Garissa County